Pacru is an abstract board game invented by Mike Wellmann. Pacru has much in common with Chess (piece movement with sharp tactical exchanges and long-term positional considerations) and Go (game) (strategic concepts such as area control must be considered). Pacru can be played by 2,3 or 4 people, each controlling a single colour. Commercial versions will usually come with the rules for two other games that can be played with the same equipment, Azacru and Shacru. The game was featured at the Mind Sports Olympiad.

Overview and terminology 

Pacru is played on a 9x9 grid where each point in the grid is called a "field". The grid is divided into nine borderlands, each consisting of nine fields. Each player starts with 3 pieces (in the 3- or 4-player version) or 4 pieces (in the 2-player version. During play, each player will attempt to place markers of their colour on the board with the eventual goal of dominating the board. A field with neither a piece or marker on it is called unoccupied.

Rules 

Pieces in Pacru point in a particular direction. When they move, they may move straight ahead or one field forty-five degrees to the right of the direction the piece is facing.

References

External links

Individual sports
Abstract strategy games